Isham is a community in Saskatchewan. According to the local RM of Snipe Lake history book, Eric Christopher Brown served as mayor from 1964-78 before moving to Arcola and starting up the first ladder golf manufacturing business in western Canada.

Unincorporated communities in Saskatchewan
Snipe Lake No. 259, Saskatchewan